Yeniışık is a village in the Yüksekova District of Hakkâri Province in Turkey. The village had a population of 384 in 2021.

The four hamlets of Alacık, Basamak, Mezra and Yukarıolukbaşı are attached to Yeniışık.

References 

Villages in Yüksekova District
Kurdish settlements in Hakkâri Province